Jason Brett Kearton (born 9 July 1969) is an Australian soccer coach and former professional player.

He was a goalkeeper from 1987 until 2004. After starting his career with Brisbane Lions, he moved to England to play in the Premier League for Everton. He also played in England with Stoke City, Blackpool, Notts County, Preston North End and Crewe Alexandra. He finished his career with Brisbane Strikers and now owns his own goalkeeping coaching school.

Playing career
Kearton was born in Ipswich, Queensland, and began his career in his native land, firstly with Coalstars and then with the Brisbane Lions. In 1988, at the age of 19, he made the biggest move of his career when then-Everton manager Colin Harvey signed him as cover for first-choice Neville Southall. He was never able to dislodge Southall from the number one spot at Goodison Park making eight appearances for the club in eight years. He spent time out on loan at Stoke City in 1991–92 where Kearton kept six clean sheets in sixteen appearances for the Potters. He also spent time on loan at Blackpool (14 appearances) and Notts County (12 appearances).

In 1995, Kearton signed for Dario Gradi's Crewe Alexandra, where he spent four years and made close to 200 league appearances helping the side gain promotion in 1996–97 by beating Brentford in the play-off final. In August 2001, he returned to his homeland and went on to play for Brisbane Strikers and Queensland Lions.

In 2014, Kearton was an unused substitute for the Roar in an FFA Cup match against Adelaide United.

Coaching career
Kearton is the owner, founder and head coach of Jason Kearton Goalkeeping, an Australian-based goalkeeping soccer academy. He was appointed goalkeeping coach of A-League club Brisbane Roar in 2012.

Personal life
He has two UK-born children, Jake and Chloe.

Career statistics

Honours
 Everton
FA Cup: 1995
FA Charity Shield: 1995

 Crewe Alexandra
Football League Second Division play-off final winner: 1997

References

External links

Jason Kearton Goalkeeping Website
Kearton's profile at Supercamp Australia

1969 births
Living people
Sportspeople from Ipswich, Queensland
Soccer players from Queensland
Association football goalkeepers
Australian soccer players
Australian expatriate soccer players
Premier League players
English Football League players
National Soccer League (Australia) players
Queensland Lions FC players
Blackpool F.C. players
Brisbane Strikers FC players
Crewe Alexandra F.C. players
Everton F.C. players
Notts County F.C. players
Preston North End F.C. players
Stoke City F.C. players
Expatriate footballers in England